2nd Madras Native Infantry may refer to:

1st Battalion which became the 62nd Punjabis
2nd Battalion which became the 80th Carnatic Infantry